Heather E. Houston (born February 4, 1959) is a Canadian curler and world champion. She is from Red Rock, Ontario and curls out of the Fort William Curling Club in Thunder Bay, Ontario.

Curling career 
Houston won the 1988 and 1991 Ontario Scotties Tournament of Hearts, skipping her team.

She made her Scotties debut at the 1988 Scott Tournament of Hearts. The team had to win two tie-breakers before winning two playoff games to claim the championship. They defeated the defending champion Pat Sanders.

At the 1988 World Championships, the team won the silver medal, losing to Germany's Andrea Schöpp in the final. The Hearts victory gave them a berth at the 1989 Scott Tournament of Hearts. The team would go on to win that as well. They had to win three playoff games before beating Chris More of Manitoba in the final.

At the 1989 World Championships, they avenged their silver medal by defeating Trine Trulsen of Norway in the final.  Their Hearts victory in 1989 qualified them for the 1990 Scott Tournament of Hearts.

She received bronze at the Scotties Tournament of Hearts in 1990 and 1991.
She was Champion skip at the 1996 TSN Skins Game.

Awards
Heather Houston received the Velma Springstead Trophy in 1989.

The Houston team was inducted into the Northwestern Sports Hall of Fame in 1994. This same year they were also inducted into the Canadian Curling Hall of Fame.

Personal life
In 1988, Houston was a graphic artist with the Lakehead Board of Education. She is the daughter of Tom and Florence Houston.

References

External links
 

1959 births
Canadian women curlers
World curling champions
Curlers from Northern Ontario
Living people
Canadian women's curling champions
People from Thunder Bay District